World Handball Championship may refer to:

IHF World Men's Handball Championship
IHF World Women's Handball Championship
IHF Men's Junior World Championship
IHF Women's Junior World Championship
IHF Men's Youth World Championship
IHF Women's Youth World Championship